Maduabuchi "Abuchi" Obinwa (born January 15, 1997) is an American professional soccer player who plays as a midfielder.

Youth
Born in Columbus, Ohio, Obinwa spent time in his youth with Chicago Magic PSG, an affiliate of French club Paris Saint-Germain. While with the team, he was named the 2013 U.S. Soccer Development Academy's U15/16 Central Conference Player of the Year. He also played with the PSG academy and spent time with the youth academy of Spanish club Real Madrid.

Obinwa signed his first professional contract with German club Hannover 96 on January 29, 2015, six months after he had signed an amateur contract with the club. He never made a professional appearance, only appearing for the U19 side in the Under-19 Bundesliga North/Northeast. Obinwa made six appearances over two seasons with the U19s. He also appeared once on the bench for Hannover 96 II in the Regionalliga Nord. Obinwa was an unused substitute against VfR Neumünster on March 29, 2015.

Club career

Columbus Crew SC
On January 25, 2017 Obinwa signed with his hometown club Columbus Crew SC of Major League Soccer. He made his first appearance for Columbus on July 17 in a friendly against German club Eintracht Frankfurt, replacing Mohammed Abu in the 67th minute of a 1–0 victory for Crew SC. Obinwa spent the rest of the season on loan to Pittsburgh, and finished the year without appearing again for Crew SC.

On December 1, 2017, Crew SC declined Obinwa's contract option. He left the club after just one season, and did not make an official appearance while in Columbus.

Loan to Pittsburgh Riverhounds
On March 25, 2017 Columbus sent Obinwa on loan to their affiliate Pittsburgh Riverhounds in the USL. Obinwa made his professional debut on April 8, 2017 against Charleston Battery, entering in the 13th minute to replace fellow Crew SC loanee Ben Swanson as the Riverhounds picked up a 2–1 victory. Four days later, April 12, he started for the first time in his professional career, against Saint Louis FC. Obinwa played 67 minutes before being replaced by Michael Green as the Riverhounds were defeated 2–1. Obinwa played sparingly for the remainder of the season, finishing the year with just seven appearances for Pittsburgh.

Lusitano FCV
Obinwa joined Portuguese third division side Lusitano FCV in 2018.

South Georgia Tormenta FC
Obinwa returned to the United States by signing with USL League One's South Georgia Tormenta FC on December 12, 2019.

FC Tulsa
On January 20, 2022, Obinwa signed with USL Championship club FC Tulsa. He was released by Tulsa following the 2022 season.

International career
Obinwa has represented the United States at U15, U16, U17, U18, and U20 level. Obinwa made three appearances for the U18s at the 2014 U18 International Tournament in Lisbon, Portugal, where he played alongside future club teammate Ben Swanson. He would be called up for the U20 team for the 2015 Stevan Vilotic-Cele Tournament in Serbia, again playing alongside Swanson and making two appearances.

As a dual-citizen, Obinwa is eligible to represent the United States or Nigeria. He also qualifies for the Super Eagles through his parents, who are both Nigerian.

Nigeria age fabrication scandal
In July 2013, sixteen-year-old Obinwa controversially failed an MRI test when undergoing assessment to represent the Nigeria U17 team at the 2013 FIFA U-17 World Cup despite having the necessary paperwork from his country of birth, the United States. Nigeria went on to win the tournament and claim their fourth U-17 World Cup.

Career statistics

References

External links
 Columbus profile
 Pittsburgh profile
 
 
 

Living people
1997 births
American soccer players
American sportspeople of Nigerian descent
African-American soccer players
Soccer players from Columbus, Ohio
Association football midfielders
United States men's youth international soccer players
United States men's under-20 international soccer players
Columbus Crew players
Pittsburgh Riverhounds SC players
Major League Soccer players
USL Championship players
United Premier Soccer League players
Age controversies
American expatriate soccer players
American expatriate sportspeople in Portugal
Expatriate footballers in Portugal
Lusitano FCV players
Tormenta FC players
FC Tulsa players
21st-century African-American sportspeople